Haines Airport  is a state-owned public-use airport located three nautical miles (6 km) west of the central business district of Haines, a city in the Haines Borough in the U.S. state of Alaska. It is the primary airport serving the Haines, Klukwan, Haines Borough area and is situated on the Haines Highway, directly adjacent to the Chilkat River.

This airport is included in the National Plan of Integrated Airport Systems for 2015–2019, which categorized it as a primary commercial service (nonhub) airport based on 10,093 enplanements in 2012. As per Federal Aviation Administration records, the airport had 7,035 passenger boardings (enplanements) in calendar year 2008, 7,099 enplanements in 2009, and 9,534 in 2010.

Facilities and aircraft 
Haines Airport covers an area of 124 acres (50 ha) at an elevation of 15 feet (5 m) above mean sea level. It has one runway designated 8/26 with an asphalt surface measuring 4,000 by 100 feet (1,219 x 30 m).

For the 12-month period ending December 31, 2006, the airport had 5,700 aircraft operations, an average of 15 per day: 79% air taxi, 19% general aviation, and 2% military.

Airlines and destinations 
The following airlines offer scheduled passenger service at this airport:

Statistics

See also 
 Haines Seaplane Base
 List of airports in Alaska

References

External links 
 FAA Alaska airport diagram (GIF)
 Topographic map from USGS The National Map

Airports in Haines Borough, Alaska